Ladies Hostel is a 1973 Indian Malayalam film, directed by Hariharan and produced by Dr. Balakrishnan. The film stars Prem Nazir, Jayabharathi, Muthukulam Raghavan Pillai and Pattom Sadan in the lead roles. The film had musical score by M. S. Baburaj. The film was remade in Tamil as Then Sinduthe Vaanam starring Sivakumar and Jayachithra.

Cast

Prem Nazir as Rajan
Jayabharathi as Lally
Muthukulam Raghavan Pillai as Kunju
Pattom Sadan
 Adoor Bhasi as Bharathan
Shanthi
T. S. Muthaiah as Raghavan
Latheef
Abbas
Ambalappuzha Rajamma
Ambili
Bahadoor as Kuttan Pilla
Bappukutty
Bhaskaran
C. L. John
C. R. Lakshmi
Jaya
K. P. Ummer as Gopi
Khadeeja
Lissy
Meena as Hostel Warden Kumari Malathi Amma
Paappi
Paravoor Bharathan as Vakkeel
Philomina as Annamma
 Seema as Saleena
Pushpa
R. K. Menon
Radhamani
Rajkumar
S. V. Namboodiri
Sadhana as Reetha
Sidhan
Sujatha as Rama
Vanaja
Vincent as Ravi

Soundtrack
The music was composed by M. S. Baburaj and the lyrics were written by Sreekumaran Thampi and Dr. Balakrishnan.

References

External links
 

1973 films
1970s Malayalam-language films
Films directed by Hariharan
Malayalam films remade in other languages